Lilybuds is a computer-animated children's television series produced by Zodiak Family. The series has been made for Discovery Kids in Latin America. The CGI animated series is produced by ZKS France for Discovery Kids Latin America, with the participation of public broadcaster France Télévisions. Both broadcasters launched the series in mid-2018.

Premise 
Lilybuds live in a garden as the tiny magical gardeners. They can grow lovely plants, flowers, any kind, and they are aware of animal creatures nearby.

Characters

Lilybuds 
 Zinnia (voiced by Jules de Jongh) is the messenger of the Lilybuds. She warns them when humans come by.
 Rose (voiced by Joanna Ruiz) is the most positive lilybud and the leader of the group. She is mostly the one who grows the flowers and plants.
 Cap (voiced by Hugo Harold Harrison) is the nervous lilybud of the Lilybuds. He gets scared when he sees something that is scary to him, but there is out to be something else. He is similar to a mushroom.
 Daffodil (voiced by Nicola Stanton) is the most helpful lilybud who loves to knit.
 Thistle (voiced by Sara Markland) is the clumsiest lilybud of the Lilybuds. She plans things and unexpectedly gets ruined.
 Moss (voiced by Oliver Mason) is the most excitable lilybud who is at least worried about things getting lost.
 Lilac (voiced by Teresa Gallagher) is the most fashionable lilybud who is often very silly, sarcastic and dramatic and wants to get things on her way.
 Thorn (voiced by Jamie Quinn) is the cook of the Lilybuds. He helps out with Bucky to make food. He is always on the lookout for Ellery, preventing him from stealing their food.

Animals 
 Bucky (voiced by Jamie Quinn) is the helpful beaver. He helps Thorn make and organise the food they make.
 Spearmint (voiced by Chris Neill) is a Jerboa who's best friends with Zinnia. They do park patrols together.
 Ellery (voiced by Rasmus Hardiker) is the naughty and sarcastic chipmunk who loves to steal. He always plans to steal Thorn and Bucky's food, but his plans are getting backfired by Thorn.
 Plum (voiced by David Holt) is a baby possum who worries and gets scared a lot like Cap.

Episodes 
 A Royal Wedding
 Saving the Ducks
 Bunny Hill
 The Butterfly Pageant
 Cap's Night Garden
 Thistle's Fall Festival
 Daffodil Knits
 Rose's Plus One
 Thistle and the Egg
 Lilac Babysits
 Plum's Night Out
 Zinnia's New Ride
 Thorn's Berry Patch
 Zinnia and the Pinecone
 Lilac Finds a Ring
 Rose's Plus One
 Rose's Play
 Cap's New Friend
 A Tree for Plum
 Lilac on Ice
 Zinnia's Promise
 Rose and the Hiccups
 Lilac's Day Off
 Thorn and the Ducklings
 Thorn's House
 Island Adventure
 Spearmint's Snowdrop
 Moss and Danny
 Cap's Song
 Ellington's Magic Seeds
 Rose the Detective
 Ellery Becomes a Star
 Daffodil in Winter
 Bucky's Band
 Rose's Way Home
 Thorn and the Treasure Map
 Molly Goes to Town
 Zinnia Gets Growing
 Prince Norbert's Lesson
 Bobby is a Guest
 Lilac's Wild Wind
 Jerboa Express
 Genevieve's Gift
 Thorn and Ellery's Plan
 The Winter Rose
 Daffodil's Dream Box
 Carrot Day
 Ellery's Hats
 Cap and the Caterpillar
 Thorn and Daffodil's Royal Duties
 The Fruit Cup
 Cap's River Cruise
 Plum Wishes on a Star

Broadcast 
The series originally airs on Discovery Kids in Latin America in its first release. The series is also shown of TiJi in France, Knowledge Kids and TVO Kids in Canada, DKids in the Middle East and North Africa, France.TV in France, and Tiny Pop in the United Kingdom. The series was also viewed on the online subscription video on demand service Showmax in South Africa.

References

External links 
 

2010s French animated television series
Animated television series about children
Animated television series about animals
French children's animated television series
Television series by Banijay